"Real" is a song by the Goo Goo Dolls that is featured on the AT&T Team USA Soundtrack, a compilation containing exclusive tracks by different artists to benefit and encourage the U.S. Olympic Team.

John changed the first line of the lyrics to "You read the news, the stories never change" in the live versions he played after the Europe 2008 tour, probably because the original line also appears in Stay With You: "These streets, turn me inside out".

Track listing
iTunes Single
"Real" - 3:26

Charts

References

2008 singles
Goo Goo Dolls songs
Songs written by John Rzeznik
Songs written by Gregg Wattenberg
2008 songs
Warner Records singles